The Koshibito (in Japanese, variously: 高志人, 古志人 or 越人, all pronounced identically) were a people of ancient Japan, believed to have lived on the southern portion of the shore of the Sea of Japan in the ancient province of Koshi during the Jōmon period.

References

Tribes of ancient Japan